Khazana is a 1951 Indian Hindi-language adventure film directed by M. Sadiq and starring Madhubala and Nasir Khan. The music of the film was composed by C. Ramchandra.

Based on novel King Solomon's Mines (1885), Khazana is considered to be one of the most important Indian films made about invention and adventures. On its theatrical release in March 1951, the film became a box office hit; its success was attributed to Madhubala's popularity among masses.

Plot

Cast 
 Madhubala as Asha
 Nasir Khan
 Om Prakash
 Gope
 Cuckoo
 Raj Mehra
 Ramesh Thakur

Production 
Initially, Nargis was slated to play the lead role but she left the production due to her illness. Madhubala was then cast in the film; Sadiq explained: "Madhubala is the only girl in our industry who can match Nargis' stardom today and even beat her!"

Soundtrack 
The music director of Khazana was C. Ramchandra and lyrics were written by Rajinder Krishan. All songs were sung by Lata Mangeshkar, along with Mohammed Rafi and C. Ramchandra.

Reception 
Khazana opened to mixed reviews from critics, who praised the soundtrack but criticised Madhubala's acting. The film, nevertheless, proved immensely popular among audience, eventually becoming the eleventh highest-grossing film of 1951 (revenue wise), while Madhubala's Tarana and Badal were at the sixth and eight positions, respectively.

References

Sources

External links 
 

1951 films
1950s Hindi-language films
Films directed by M. Sadiq